Montpellier is a historic plantation house built as the main residence and headquarters of a forced-labor farm in Natchez, Mississippi. It was built in the 1840s in the Greek Revival architectural style for Charles Whitmore, an English-born planter and enslaver. It has been listed on the National Register of Historic Places since December 18, 1979.

References

Houses in Natchez, Mississippi
Greek Revival houses in Mississippi
Plantations in Mississippi
Antebellum architecture